The Cathedral Basilica of the Immaculate Conception is the cathedral of the Archdiocese of Denver of the Roman Catholic Church. It is located at the corner of Logan Street and Colfax Avenue in the North Capitol Hill neighborhood of central Denver.

History

Construction of the cathedral started in 1902 and was completed in 1911 with a final cost of approximately $500,000. The inaugural Mass was held on October 27, 1912, and consecration was in 1921. On August 7, 1912, lightning struck the west tower causing damage to the upper ; however, this was repaired before the opening.

The cathedral was raised to the status of minor basilica on Christmas Day 1979. On August 13 and 14, 1993 (for World Youth Day), Pope John Paul II celebrated Mass at the cathedral, one of only a few cathedrals in the United States so honored. In June 1997, lightning struck a second time, but this time damaged the east tower. The parish completed work to restore the tower within eight months.

During the first days of the George Floyd protests from May 29 to June 1, 2020, the cathedral basilica was vandalized multiple times by protesters and damaged by responding police. Damage included arson, spray-painted anti-Catholic phrases, and tear gas penetrating the building. No one in the cathedral basilica was injured during the protests.

In October 2021 the cathedral was vandalized again with graffiti being sprayed on doors and statues around the cathedral. It was the latest in a spate of vandalism against Catholic churches in Colorado which had damaged at least 25 other church buildings.

Architecture
Architect Leon Coquard of Detroit designed the cathedral in the French Gothic style. Its character is influenced by the 13th-century Saint Nicholas Collegiate church (collégiale Saint-Nicolas) of Munster, Moselle, France, which is the birthplace of Bishop Nicholas Chrysostom Matz, who supervised cathedral construction.

The main façade houses three entrances and is framed by two  spires. The structure is constructed of Indiana limestone and granite from Gunnison, Colorado. The altar, statuary, and bishop's chair are all made of Carrara marble, while other elements feature Yule marble stone from Marble, Colorado. The 75 stained glass windows are from the Royal Bavarian Art Institute in Munich founded by Franz Xaver Zettler. The church has the most leaded stained glass of any church in North America. When opened, the cathedral could accommodate 1,000 worshipers. However, due to significant alterations following the liturgical reforms initiated at the Second Vatican Council (including the removal of the historic stone altar rail and the expansion of the chancel to accommodate a second, freestanding altar) the church now accommodates 895.

Ministries
The cathedral offers three daily and six Sunday Masses as well as other sacraments regularly. Additional services to the community include the yearly provision of 50,000–60,000 lunches to the poor in the area.

See also

Julia Greeley
List of Catholic cathedrals in the United States
List of cathedrals in the United States
Roman Catholic Marian churches
Yule marble

References

External links

 Official Cathedral Site
 Roman Catholic Archdiocese of Denver Official Site

Roman Catholic churches in Denver
Immaculate Conception Denver
Immaculate Conception Denver
Roman Catholic churches completed in 1911
Colorado State Register of Historic Properties
Churches on the National Register of Historic Places in Colorado
National Register of Historic Places in Denver
Religious organizations established in 1860
Gothic Revival church buildings in Colorado
20th-century Roman Catholic church buildings in the United States